Tobin is a census-designated place (CDP) in Plumas County, California, United States. The population was 12 at the 2010 census, up from 11 at the 2000 census.

Geography
Tobin is located at  (39.920539, -121.298918).

Demographics

2010
At the 2010 census Tobin had a population of 12. The population density was 2.4 people per square mile (0.9/km). The racial makeup of Tobin was 12 (100.0%) White.  Hispanic or Latino of any race were 0 people (0.0%).

The whole population lived in households, no one lived in non-institutionalized group quarters and no one was institutionalized.

There were 8 households, 0 (0%) had children under the age of 18 living in them, 3 (37.5%) were opposite-sex married couples living together, 0 (0%) had a female householder with no husband present, 0 (0%) had a male householder with no wife present.  There were 0 (0%) unmarried opposite-sex partnerships, and 1 (12.5%) same-sex married couples or partnerships. 4 households (50.0%) were one person and 1 (12.5%) had someone living alone who was 65 or older. The average household size was 1.50.  There were 3 families (37.5% of households); the average family size was 2.00.

The age distribution was 0 people (0%) under the age of 18, 1 people (8.3%) aged 18 to 24, 1 people (8.3%) aged 25 to 44, 9 people (75.0%) aged 45 to 64, and 1 people (8.3%) who were 65 or older.  The median age was 52.8 years. For every 100 females, there were 71.4 males.  For every 100 females age 18 and over, there were 71.4 males.

There were 17 housing units at an average density of 3.4 per square mile, of the occupied units 2 (25.0%) were owner-occupied and 6 (75.0%) were rented. The homeowner vacancy rate was 0%; the rental vacancy rate was 12.5%.  2 people (16.7% of the population) lived in owner-occupied housing units and 10 people (83.3%) lived in rental housing units.

2000
At the 2000 census there were 11 people, 8 households, and 1 family residing in the CDP. The population density was 2.2 people per square mile (0.8/km). There were 21 housing units at an average density of 4.2 per square mile (1.6/km).  The racial makeup of the CDP was 72.73% White, 9.09% from other races, and 18.18% from two or more races. Hispanic or Latino of any race were 27.27%.

There were 8 households, of which 12.5% had children under the age of 18 living with them, 12.5% were married couples living together, and 87.5% were non-families. 87.5% of households were one person and 25.0% were one person aged 65 or older. The average household size was 1.38 and the average family size was 4.00.

The age distribution was 18.2% under the age of 18, 18.2% from 25 to 44, 45.5% from 45 to 64, and 18.2% 65 or older. The median age was 50 years. For every 100 females, there were 266.7 males. For every 100 females age 18 and over, there were 350.0 males.

The median household income was $11,250 and the median family income  was $11,250. Males had a median income of $ versus $ for females. The per capita income for the CDP was $2,584, one of the lowest of all statistically measured locations in the United States (although the small sample size means this status must be taken cautiously). Below the poverty line were 100.0% of people, 100.0% of families, 100.0% of those under 18 and 100.0% 65 or over.

Media
The primary local news source is the Feather River Bulletin, a newspaper published every Wednesday.

Politics

See also
Tobin Bridges

References

Census-designated places in Plumas County, California
Census-designated places in California